Nicholas Peter Conte (March 24, 1910 – April 15, 1975), known professionally as Richard Conte, was an American actor. He appeared in more than 100 films from the 1940s through 1970s, including I'll Cry Tomorrow, Ocean's 11, and The Godfather.

Early life
Richard Conte was born Nicholas Peter Conte on March 24, 1910, in Jersey City, New Jersey, the son of Italian-Americans Julia (Fina), a seamstress, and Pasquale Conte, a barber. He graduated from William L. Dickinson High School in Jersey City.

Conte worked as a truck driver, messenger, shoe salesman, and singing waiter before starting his acting career. He was discovered by actors Elia Kazan and John Garfield during his job at a Connecticut resort, which led to Conte finding stage work.

He eventually earned a scholarship to study at the Neighborhood Playhouse in New York City, where he became a standout actor.

Conte was a Republican who campaigned for Dwight Eisenhower during the 1952 presidential election. He practiced Roman Catholicism.

Career

Stage
He made his film debut under the name Nicholas Conte in Heaven with a Barbed Wire Fence (1939) at 20th Century Fox. He played Tony, a hobo who meets up with Joe (Glenn Ford who was also making his film debut) and Anita (Jean Rogers). The three of them make their way west hopping trains. They are later joined by Professor B (Raymond Walburn). 

He made his Broadway debut in My Heart's in the Highlands (1939) for the Group Theatre. Also for the Group he was in Clifford Odets' Night Music (1940). He performed in the road company of Golden Boy.

On Broadway he was in Heavenly Express (1941), and Walk Into My Parlor (1941). He was in a hit in Jason (1942) then was in The Family (1943).

During World War II, Conte served in the United States Army, but was discharged because of eye trouble.

20th Century Fox
In May 1943, Conte signed a long-term contract with 20th Century Fox, changing his name to Richard Conte. His first Fox film was Guadalcanal Diary (1943), where he was billed fourth.

He followed it with another war drama, The Purple Heart (1944), directed by Lewis Milestone; he was billed second, beneath Dana Andrews.

Conte had a smaller part in Captain Eddie (1945), a biopic about Eddie Rickenbacker, and played an Italian POW in A Bell for Adano (1945).

Conte had the star role in another war film for Milestone, A Walk in the Sun (1945), where he was teamed again with Andrews.

Stardom
Fox promoted Conte to top billing with a film noir, The Spider (1945). Although a "B" film for the studio, it was successful enough to establish Conte in film noir.

He had a good support role in Somewhere in the Night (1946) directed by Joseph Mankiewicz then supported James Cagney in a spy film, 13 Rue Madeleine (1946), directed by Henry Hathaway.

Conte was borrowed by Enterprise Productions for The Other Love (1947) with Barbara Stanwyck and David Niven. Back at Fox he had an excellent part in Hathaway's crime drama Call Northside 777 (1948), as the prisoner whose innocence is proved by James Stewart.

Conte was teamed with Victor Mature in Cry of the City (1948). MGM borrowed him to support Wallace Beery in Big Jack (1949), Beery's final film, then he did another for Mankiewicz at Fox, House of Strangers (1949) with Edward G. Robinson, playing Max Monetti, a lawyer who defends his father (Robinson) against government charges of banking irregularities and goes to prison for jury tampering.

Conte was top billed in Thieves' Highway (1949), directed by Jules Dassin, and co-starred with Gene Tierney in Otto Preminger's classic film noir Whirlpool (1950).

Universal
Conte signed a contract with Universal Pictures, for whom he starred in some crime films: The Sleeping City (1950); Hollywood Story (1951), directed by William Castle; and The Raging Tide (1951).

After doing a boxing film for United Artists, The Fighter (1952), he returned to Universal for The Raiders (1952).

Conte went to Warner Bros to co-star with Anne Baxter and Ann Sothern in The Blue Gardenia 
(1953) directed by Fritz Lang. Back at Universal Conte supported Alan Ladd in Desert Legion (1953). He made Slaves of Babylon (1953) for Sam Katzman at Columbia. Conte started guest starring on TV shows such as Medallion Theatre, Ford Television Theatre, and General Electric Theater.

Bill Broidy
In 1953 Conte signed a contract with Bill Broidy to make six films over three years, under which he would be paid 25% of the profits. The first was a crime drama, Highway Dragnet (1954), based on a story by Roger Corman and went to England to make Mask of Dust (1954) for Hammer Films director Terence Fisher. He was going to direct The Wolf Pack for Broidy but it was not made.

Back in the US Conte did The Big Combo (1955) for Cornel Wilde's own company, replacing Jack Palance; New York Confidential (1955) for producer Edward Small; and  The Big Tip Off (1955) for Broidy.

Conte went back to England for Little Red Monkey (1955) and over to RKO for Bengazi (1955) and Warners for a Korean War movie Target Zero (1955).

Conte broke out of B movies with the second lead in I'll Cry Tomorrow (1955), an MGM biopic about Lillian Roth starring Susan Hayward. Conte and director Daniel Mann announced they would make Play by Play together but it was not made.

Columbia
Conte made a series of films for Columbia. He was co-starred with Judy Holliday in Full of Life (1956); played the lead in The Brothers Rico (1957); supported Anthony Perkins and Silvana Mangano in This Angry Age (1957); was one of several names in They Came to Cordura (1959).

Television
He continued to guest on TV shows like The 20th Century-Fox Hour and The Twilight Zone ("Perchance to Dream") and played the lead in a TV adaptation of The Gambler, the Nun and the Radio (1960). He had his first regular TV role in The Four Just Men (1959–60).

Conte supported Frank Sinatra in Ocean's 11 (1961) but then focused on TV: Alfred Hitchcock Presents, Bus Stop, Naked City, Checkmate, Frontier Circus, The DuPont Show of the Week, The Untouchables, Alcoa Premiere, Going My Way, Kraft Mystery Theater, 77 Sunset Strip, The Reporter, Kraft Suspense Theatre and Arrest and Trial.

He had a support role in Who's Been Sleeping in My Bed? (1963), Circus World (1964) and The Greatest Story Ever Told (1965) (playing Barabbas) and the lead in The Eyes of Annie Jones (1964) for Robert L. Lippert. After Synanon (1965) he had the lead in Stay Tuned for Terror (1965), shot in Argentina.

Conte supported Frank Sinatra in Assault on a Queen (1966) and was one of several stars in Hotel (1967). In 1966, Conte landed a supporting role in the short-lived CBS sitcom, The Jean Arthur Show.

He appeared as Lieutenant Dave Santini in two Frank Sinatra crime films, Tony Rome (1967) and Lady in Cement (1968).  In between he did a Western in Europe, Sentenza di morte (1968).

In 1968 he released his only film as a director, Operation Cross Eagles, in which he also starred.

Conte's later performances include The Bold Ones: The Lawyers, The Challengers (1970),  and The Name of the Game (1970).

The Godfather

Conte had one of his most memorable performances in The Godfather (1972) as Don Barzini. He was at one time also considered for the title role, Don Vito Corleone, a role that Marlon Brando eventually filled.

The success of the film led to Conte being cast in a series of "mob" roles: Murder Inferno (1973), The Big Family (1973), Pete, Pearl & the Pole (1973), My Brother Anastasia (1973), The Violent Professionals (1973), No Way Out (1973) with Alain Delon,  Anna, quel particolare piacere (1973), Shoot First, Die Later (1974) and Violent Rome (1975). He did horror films, Evil Eye (1975), A Diary of a Murderess (1975) and Naked Exorcism (1975).

Family
Conte was married to actress Ruth Storey, with whom he adopted a son, film editor Mark Conte. In 1950, Conte and Storey were living at 1366 San Ysidro Drive in Beverly Hills. They divorced in 1963. He married his second wife, Shirlee Garner, in 1973; they remained married until Conte's death. His grandson is National Football League free safety Chris Conte. Chris is the son of Mark Conte.

Death
On April 3, 1975, Conte suffered a massive heart attack and a stroke. He was taken to UCLA Medical Center where the staff worked for eight hours to keep him alive. He was put in intensive care and died on April 15. He is buried in the Westwood Memorial Park in Los Angeles.

Awards

Selected filmography

 Heaven with a Barbed Wire Fence (1939) as Tony 
 Guadalcanal Diary (1943) as Capt. Davis
 The Purple Heart (1944) as Lt. Angelo Canelli
 Captain Eddie (1945) as Pvt. John Bartek
 A Bell for Adano (1945) as Nicolo (Italian POW)
 The Spider (1945) as Chris Conlon
 A Walk in the Sun (1945) as Pvt. Rivera
 13 Rue Madeleine (1946) as Bill O'Connell
 Somewhere in the Night (1946) as Mel Phillips
 The Other Love (1947) as Paul Clermont
 Call Northside 777 (1948) as Frank W. Wiecek
 Cry of the City (1948) as Martin Rome
 Big Jack (1949) as Dr. Alexander Meade
 House of Strangers (1949) as Max Monetti
 Thieves' Highway (1949) as Nick Garcos
 Whirlpool (1950) as Dr. William 'Bill' Sutton
 The Sleeping City (1950) as Fred Rowan, aka Fred Gilbert
 Hollywood Story (1951) as Larry O'Brien
 The Raging Tide (1951) as Bruno Felkin
 The Fighter (1952) as Felipe Rivera
 Riders of Vengeance (1952) as Jan Morrell
 The Blue Gardenia (1953) as Casey Mayo
 Desert Legion (1953) as Crito Damou / Omar Ben Khalif
 Slaves of Babylon (1953) as Nahum
 Highway Dragnet (1954) as Jim Henry
 Mask of Dust (1954) as Peter Wells
 The Big Combo (1955) as Mr. Brown
 New York Confidential (1955) as Nick Magellan
 The Big Tip Off (1955) as Johnny Denton
 Little Red Monkey (1955) as Bill Locklin
 Bengazi (1955) as John Gillmore
 Target Zero (1955) as Lt. Tom Flagler
 I'll Cry Tomorrow (1955) as Tony Bardeman
 Full of Life (1956) as Nick Rocco
 The Brothers Rico (1957) as Eddie Rico
 This Angry Age (The Sea Wall) (1957) as Michael
 The Untouchables  (1959-Season 2 Episode15) as Ira Bauer / Arnie Seeger
 They Came to Cordura (1959) as Cpl. Milo Trubee
 The Twilight Zone (1959) as Edward Hall
 Ocean's 11 (1960) as Anthony Bergdorf
 Pepe (1960) as Richard Conte
 Naked City (1962 Season 3 Episode 17) as Phil Clifford 
 Who's Been Sleeping in My Bed? (1963) as Leonard Ashley
 The Eyes of Annie Jones (1964) as David Wheeler
 Circus World (1964) as Aldo Alfredo
 Arrest and Trial (1964 Season 1 Episode 26) as Paul Dunnell
 The Greatest Story Ever Told (1965) as Barabbas
 Synanon (1965) as Reid Kimble
 Extraña invasión (Stay Tuned for Terror) (1965)
 Assault on a Queen (1966) as Tony Moreno
 Hotel (1967) as Detective Dupere
 Tony Rome (1967) as Lt. Dave Santini
 Death Sentence (1968) as Diaz
 Operation Cross Eagles (1968) as Lt. Bradford (also directed)
 Lady in Cement (1968) as Lt. Dave Santini
 Explosion (1969) as Dr. Philip Neal
 The Challengers (TV 1970) as Ritchie
 The Godfather (1972) as Don Emilio Barzini
 Il Boss (Murder Inferno) (1973) as Don Corrasco
 The Big Family (1973) as Don Antonio Marchesi
 My Brother Anastasia (1973) as Alberto 'Big Al' Anastasia
 The Violent Professionals (1973) as Padulo
 Pete, Pearl & the Pole (1973) as Bruno
 Tony Arzenta (Big Guns) (1973) as Nick Gusto
 Anna, quel particolare piacere (1973) as Riccardo Sogliani
 Shoot First, Die Later (1974) as Mazzanti
 Evil Eye (1975) as Dr. Stone
 La encadenada (A Diary of a Murderess) (1975) as Alexander
 Violent Rome (1975) as Lawyer Sartori
 Un urlo dalle tenebre (Naked Exorcism) (1975) as Exorcist
 The Godfather Saga'' (1977) as Don Emilio Barzini

Radio appearances

References

External links

 

1910 births
1975 deaths
20th-century American male actors
20th Century Studios contract players
American male film actors
American male stage actors
American male television actors
American people of Italian descent
Burials at Westwood Village Memorial Park Cemetery
William L. Dickinson High School alumni
Male actors from Jersey City, New Jersey
Male actors from Los Angeles
California Republicans
New Jersey Republicans
American Roman Catholics
United States Army personnel of World War II